1985 Masters may refer to:
1985 Masters Tournament, golf
1985 Masters (snooker)
1985 Nabisco Masters, tennis